Onopko or Onopka (Cyrillic: Онопко) is a gender-neutral Ukrainian surname that may refer to the following notable people: 
 Serhiy Onopko (born 1973), Ukrainian football midfielder, brother of Viktor
 Snejana Onopka (born 1986), Ukrainian model
 Viktor Onopko (born 1969), Russian football coach and former player of Ukrainian origin

See also
 

Ukrainian-language surnames